The Hunter Line is a commuter train line operated by NSW TrainLink, running from Newcastle  to Dungog and Scone in the New South Wales Hunter Region. It operates on the Newcastle, Main North and North Coast lines.

Description of Route
Hunter Line services operate from Newcastle on the Newcastle branch line to Islington Junction, the Main North line between Islington Junction and Scone, the North Coast line between Maitland and Dungog. The Hunter Line shares its portion of the Main North Line and North Coast Line with NSW TrainLink North Western and North Coast regional services respectively.

Services
Services run regularly between Newcastle and Telarah, with infrequent services to Dungog and Singleton, Muswellbrook and Scone. Services are operated by Endeavour and Hunter railcars.

Until 2007, 620/720 class railcars operated the service. The line was the last in Australia to have a regular steam hauled passenger service. The final service was hauled from Newcastle to Singleton on 24 July 1971 by 3246. Diesel locomotive hauled services operated until replaced by 620/720 and 660/760 class railcars in 1984.

The line was truncated to terminate at Hamilton from 5 January 2015. It was extended to Newcastle Interchange when this opened on 15 October 2017.

Trains that service the line have two carriages, while some peak hour services have four carriages. There are no quiet carriages on these trains.

Stations

Patronage

References

NSW TrainLink
Rail transport in the Hunter Region
Regional railway lines in New South Wales
Standard gauge railways in Australia